Wollondilly is an electoral district of the Legislative Assembly in the Australian state of New South Wales. It is represented by Nathaniel Smith of the Liberal Party.

History
Wollondilly was first established in 1904, partly replacing Bowral.  In 1920, with the introduction of proportional representation, it absorbed Wollongong and Allowrie and elected three members simultaneously.  In 1927, it was split into the single-member electorates of Wollondilly, Wollongong and Illawarra.  It was abolished in 1981, but was recreated for the 2007 election, partly replacing Southern Highlands.

Wollondilly is one of four electorates in the New South Wales Legislative Assembly to have been held by two Premiers of New South Wales while in office. Both Premiers Tom Lewis and George Fuller held Wollondilly while in office, the other three electorates being Ku-ring-gai, Maroubra and Willoughby.

Wollondilly was recreated for the 2007 state election, covering areas previously belonging to the districts of Campbelltown, Camden and Southern Highlands, the last of which was abolished.  It encompassed all of Wollondilly Shire (including Picton, Tahmoor, Bargo, Yanderra, Thirlmere, Buxton, Wilton,  Appin, Douglas Park, Menangle, Cawdor, The Oaks, Oakdale, Warragamba and Silverdale) and part of the City of Campbelltown (including Ambarvale, Glen Alpine, some of Bradbury, St Helens Park, Rosemeadow, Gilead, Wedderburn and Menangle Park).

The next redistribution prior to the 2015 state election saw Wollondilly undergo a southward expansion. It gained the towns of Hill Top, Balmoral, Yerrinbool, Colo Vale, Willow Vale, Mittagong and Bowral from the district of Goulburn. At the same time Wollondilly ceded several suburbs at its northern end, losing  Ambarvale, Glen Alpine, Bradbury, St Helens Park, Rosemeadow, Gilead, Wedderburn and Menangle Park to the district of Campbelltown and Camden Park to the district of Camden.

Members for Wollondilly

First incarnation 1904–1981

Second incarnation 2007–

Election results

References

Wollondilly
Wollondilly
1904 establishments in Australia
Wollondilly
1981 disestablishments in Australia
Wollondilly
2007 establishments in Australia